Narayan Beniwal is an Indian Politician in the Rashtriya Loktantrik Party. He was elected as a member of Rajasthan Legislative Assembly from Khinwasar on 24 October 2019.

Narayan Beniwal is brother of former three times MLA of khinwasar legislative assembly Hanuman Beniwal .

References

Rashtriya Loktantrik Party politicians
Living people
1975 births
Rajasthan MLAs 2018–2023